Chaitén Airfield was an airport serving Chaitén, a town in the Los Lagos Region of Chile. The airport was damaged and closed after the 2008 eruption of Chaitén Volcano.

In 2013, construction began on Nuevo Chaitén Airport, which then assumed the ICAO and IATA codes of the closed airport.

See also

Transport in Chile
List of airports in Chile

References

External links

Defunct airports
Airports in Los Lagos Region